Associazione Sportiva Dilettantistica San Cesareo is an Italian football club based in San Cesareo, Lazio. Currently it plays in Italy's Serie D.

History

Foundation
The club was founded in 1967.

Serie D
In the season 2011–12 the team was promoted from Eccellenza Lazio/B to Serie D.

Colors and badge
The team's colors are red and blue.

Honours
Eccellenza:
Winner (1): 2011–12

References

External links
Official website 

Football clubs in Italy
Association football clubs established in 1967
Football clubs in Lazio
1967 establishments in Italy
Sport in the Metropolitan City of Rome Capital